Lebyazhye (also given as Kamyshin Northwest, Lebyazh'ye, Gromovo, Kotly, and Mikhailovka) is an former air base in Russia located 18 km northwest of Kamyshin and 170 km north of Volgograd.  The base has an unusually wide runway and large tarmac space.

Aerial activity here started in the 1950s. 

The airfield was home to the 1st Guards Instructional Fighter-Bomber Aviation Regiment (1 Gv IAPIB) flying Mikoyan-Gurevich MiG-23 (ASCC: Flogger), Mikoyan MiG-27K (ASCC: Flogger-J2), and Sukhoi Su-24 (ASCC: Fencer) aircraft in the mid-1990s. It arrived from the 36th Air Army in Hungary. The 1 Gv IAPIB used to fall under the 1080th Training Aviation Centre for Retraining of Personnel (1080 UATs PLS) at Borisoglebsk. However, according to Air Forces Monthly in July 2007, it was by that time a direct reporting unit to Russian Air Force headquarters. The regiment was absorbed by the 6970th Aviation Base on 1 September 2009.

3rd Bomber Aviation Regiment arrived from Szprotawa, Poland, on 4 June 1992 (where it had been part of 149th Bomber Aviation Division), and disbanded at Lebyazhe, Volgograd Oblast sometime in the later part of that year.

References

Soviet Air Force bases
Soviet Frontal Aviation
Russian Air Force bases